The Guadalupe Hotel is a historic hotel in downtown New Braunfels, Texas. It is located on the Main Plaza, adjacent from the Comal County Courthouse.

See also

National Register of Historic Places listings in Comal County, Texas
Recorded Texas Historic Landmarks in Comal County

References

External links

New Braunfels, Texas
Hotels in Texas
Historic hotels in the United States